Viktor Pfeifer (born May 16, 1987) is an Austrian former competitive figure skater. An eight-time Austrian national champion, he has placed as high as eighth at the European Championships (2013) and has competed three times at the Winter Olympics, placing 22nd in 2006, 21st in 2010 and 26th in 2014.

Career 
In the 2002–03 season, Pfeifer won Austria's senior national men's title for the first time. The following season, he began competing on the ISU Junior Grand Prix series. 

In 2004–05, Pfeifer competed in his second JGP season and finished 12th at the 2005 World Junior Championships. He also made his senior international debut at the 2005 European Championships, where he was 18th. He then placed 23rd at his first senior World Championships.

In 2005–06, Pfeifer again began his season on the junior level, placing fifth in both of his JGP events. He then competed on the senior level at the 2005 Karl Schäfer Memorial, the final opportunity for countries to qualify an Olympic entry. His placement, fifth, gave Austria a spot in the 2006 Olympic men's event. Pfeifer won his third senior national title and was sent to the Olympics where he placed 22nd. He ended his season at the 2006 World Championships, finishing 26th.

In 2006, Pfeifer moved from Austria to train in Aston, Pennsylvania. Two years later, he began training under Priscilla Hill at the Skating Club of Wilmington in Wilmington, Delaware. He stated that Austrian skating officials disagreed with his decision to train abroad and his funding dried up, leading him to consider no longer competing for the country. He was not sent to any ISU Championships in 2007 and 2008.

Pfeifer returned to international competition in autumn 2008. He placed tenth at the 2008 Nebelhorn Trophy and fifth at the 2008 Karl Schäfer Memorial before taking his fourth national title. He was 29th at both the 2009 European Championships and 2009 World Championships.

The final opportunity to qualify for the 2010 Winter Olympics was the 2009 Nebelhorn Trophy in September. Pfeifer placed fifth and earned a spot for Austria in the men's event in Vancouver. Austria consequently resumed funding his training. After winning his fifth national title, Pfeifer was sent to the 2010 European Championships where he placed 17th. He then competed at the 2010 Winter Olympics, placing 21st. His final event of the season was the 2010 World Championships where he was 20th.

In the 2012–13 season, Pfeifer was eighth at the European Championships, the best European result of his career. He then placed 20th at the 2013 World Championships, earning a spot for Austria in the 2014 Olympic men's event.

Pfeifer began coaching at The Skating Club of Wilmington when he was still a competitive skater. He retired from competition on May 27, 2014.

Personal life 
Pfeifer began playing the cello as a child and attended a music conservatory in Austria before deciding to focus on skating. He studied business management and economics at the University of Delaware.

Programs

Results
GP: Grand Prix; JGP: Junior Grand Prix

2003–2014

1998–2003

References

External links 

 Official site of Viktor Pfeifer

Navigation

1987 births
Living people
Austrian male single skaters
Olympic figure skaters of Austria
Figure skaters at the 2006 Winter Olympics
Figure skaters at the 2010 Winter Olympics
Figure skaters at the 2014 Winter Olympics
Sportspeople from Graz
Austrian expatriate sportspeople in the United States